Cham Gerdeleh or Cham Geredeleh may refer to:

Cham Gerdeleh-ye Olya
Cham Gerdeleh-ye Sofla
Cham Geredeleh-ye Vosta